Cynthia Leduc (born 16 February 1997 in Creteil) is a French sprinter. She won a gold medal in the 4 × 200 metres relay at the 2019 World Relays in Yokohama. Later that year, she won a silver medal in the 100 metres at the 2019 European U23 Championships in Gävle.

In 2014, she competed in the girls' 100 metres event at the 2014 Summer Youth Olympics held in Nanjing, China.

International competitions

1Did not finish in the final

Personal bests
Outdoor
100 metres – 11.33 (+0.4 m/s, Chateauroux 2019)
200 metres – 23.35 (+1.6 m/s, Cergy-Pontoise 2018)
400 metres – 54.10 (Forbach 2018)

Indoor
60 metres – 7.29 (Nantes 2019)
200 metres – 24.09 (Nantes 1016)

References

1997 births
Living people
French female sprinters
Sportspeople from Créteil
Athletes (track and field) at the 2014 Summer Youth Olympics
Athletes (track and field) at the 2020 Summer Olympics
Olympic athletes of France